Jammie Seay House is a historic home located at Spartanburg, Spartanburg County, South Carolina.  It was built between 1770–1800, and is one-story, log house with a loft, field stone foundation piers, gabled roof, and an end field stone chimney. It has a one-story "L" rear addition and a one-story lean-to front porch. It was built by Jammie Seay, a Revolutionary War soldier of the Second Virginia Infantry. It is believed to be the oldest house within the present limits of Spartanburg.

It was listed on the National Register of Historic Places in 1971.

The house is owned by the Spartanburg County Historical Association and is open for tours in season.

References

External links
 Seay House - Spartanburg County Historical Association

Houses on the National Register of Historic Places in South Carolina
Houses completed in 1785
Houses in Spartanburg, South Carolina
Museums in Spartanburg County, South Carolina
National Register of Historic Places in Spartanburg, South Carolina
Historic house museums in South Carolina